The 2016 World RX of Great Britain was the fourth round of the third season of the FIA World Rallycross Championship. The event was held at the Lydden Hill Race Circuit in Wootton, Kent.

Supercar

Heats

Semi-finals
Semi-Final 1

Semi-Final 2

Final

RX Lites

Heats

Semi-finals
Semi-Final 1

Semi-Final 2

Final

Standings after the event

Supercar standings

RX Lites standings

 Note: Only the top five positions are included.

References

External links

|- style="text-align:center"
|width="35%"|Previous race:2016 World RX of Belgium
|width="30%"|FIA World Rallycross Championship2016 season
|width="35%"|Next race:2016 World RX of Norway
|- style="text-align:center"
|width="35%"|Previous race:2015 World RX of Great Britain
|width="30%"|World RX of Great Britain
|width="35%"|Next race:2017 World RX of Great Britain
|- style="text-align:center"

Great Britain
World RX
World RX